The principle of sufficient reason states that everything must have a reason or a cause.  The principle was articulated and made prominent by Gottfried Wilhelm Leibniz, with many antecedents, and was further used and developed by Arthur Schopenhauer and Sir William Hamilton, 9th Baronet.

History 
The modern formulation of the principle is usually ascribed to early Enlightenment philosopher Gottfried Leibniz. Leibniz formulated it, but was not an originator. The idea was conceived of and utilized by various philosophers who preceded him, including Anaximander, Parmenides, Archimedes, Plato and Aristotle, Cicero, Avicenna, Thomas Aquinas, and Spinoza. One often pointed to is in Anselm of Canterbury: his phrase quia Deus nihil sine ratione facit (because God does nothing without reason) and the formulation of the ontological argument for the existence of God. A clearer connection is with the cosmological argument for the existence of God. The principle can be seen in both Thomas Aquinas and William of Ockham.

Notably, the post-Kantian philosopher Arthur Schopenhauer elaborated the principle, and used it as the foundation of his system. Some philosophers have associated the principle of sufficient reason with "ex nihilo nihil fit (nothing comes from nothing)". William Hamilton identified the laws of inference modus ponens with the "law of Sufficient Reason, or of Reason and Consequent" and modus tollens with its contrapositive expression.

Formulation

The principle has a variety of expressions, all of which are perhaps best summarized by the following:

For every entity X, if X exists, then there is a sufficient explanation for why X exists.
For every event E, if E occurs, then there is a sufficient explanation for why E occurs.
For every proposition P, if P is true, then there is a sufficient explanation for why P is true.

A sufficient explanation may be understood either in terms of reasons or causes, for like many philosophers of the period, Leibniz did not carefully distinguish between the two. The resulting principle is very different, however, depending on which interpretation is given (see Payne's summary of Schopenhauer's Fourfold Root).

It is an open question whether the principle of sufficient reason can be applied to axioms within a logic construction like a mathematical or a physical theory, because axioms are propositions accepted as having no justification possible within the system.
The principle declares that all propositions considered to be  should be deducible from the set axioms at the base of the construction. However, Gödel has shown that for every sufficiently expressive deductive system a proposition exists that can neither be proved nor disproved (see Gödel's incompleteness theorems).

Leibniz's view
Leibniz identified two kinds of truth, necessary and contingent truths. And he claimed that all truths are based upon two principles: (1) non-contradiction, and (2) sufficient reason. In the Monadology, he says, 
Our reasonings are grounded upon two great principles, that of contradiction, in virtue of which we judge false that which involves a contradiction, and true that which is opposed or contradictory to the false;
And that of sufficient reason, in virtue of which we hold that there can be no fact real or existing, no statement true, unless there be a sufficient reason, why it should be so and not otherwise, although these reasons usually cannot be known by us (paragraphs 31 and 32).
Necessary truths can be derived from the law of identity (and the principle of non-contradiction): "Necessary truths are those that can be demonstrated through an analysis of terms, so that in the end they become identities, just as in Algebra an equation expressing an identity ultimately results from the substitution of values [for variables]. That is, necessary truths depend upon the principle of contradiction." The sufficient reason for a necessary truth is that its negation is a contradiction.

Leibniz admitted contingent truths, that is, facts in the world that are not necessarily true, but that are nonetheless true. Even these contingent truths, according to Leibniz, can only exist on the basis of sufficient reasons. Since the sufficient reasons for contingent truths are largely unknown to humans, Leibniz made appeal to infinitary sufficient reasons, to which God uniquely has access:

In contingent truths, even though the predicate is in the subject, this can never be demonstrated, nor can a proposition ever be reduced to an equality or to an identity, but the resolution proceeds to infinity, God alone seeing, not the end of the resolution, of course, which does not exist, but the connection of the terms or the containment of the predicate in the subject, since he sees whatever is in the series.

Without this qualification, the principle can be seen as a description of a certain notion of closed system, in which there is no 'outside' to provide unexplained events with causes. It is also in tension with the paradox of Buridan's ass, because although the facts supposed in the paradox would present a counterexample to the claim that all contingent truths are determined by sufficient reasons, the key premise of the paradox must be rejected when one considers Leibniz's typical infinitary conception of the world.

 In consequence of this, the case also of Buridan's ass between two meadows, impelled equally towards both of them, is a fiction that cannot occur in the universe....For the universe cannot be halved by a plane drawn through the middle of the ass, which is cut vertically through its length, so that all is equal and alike on both sides.....Neither the parts of the universe nor the viscera of the animal are alike nor are they evenly placed on both sides of this vertical plane. There will therefore always be many things in the ass and outside the ass, although they be not apparent to us, which will determine him to go on one side rather than the other. And although man is free, and the ass is not, nevertheless for the same reason it must be true that in man likewise the case of a perfect equipoise between two courses is impossible. (Theodicy, pg. 150)

Leibniz also used the principle of sufficient reason to refute the idea of absolute space:

I say then, that if space is an absolute being, there would be something for which it would be impossible there should be a sufficient reason. Which is against my axiom. And I prove it thus. Space is something absolutely uniform; and without the things placed in it, one point in space does not absolutely differ in any respect whatsoever from another point of space.  Now from hence it follows, (supposing space to be something in itself, beside the order of bodies among themselves,) that 'tis impossible that there should be a reason why God, preserving the same situation of bodies among themselves, should have placed them in space after one particular manner, and not otherwise; why everything was not placed the quite contrary way, for instance, by changing East into West.

As a law of thought

The principle was one of the four recognised laws of thought, that held a place in European pedagogy of logic and reasoning (and, to some extent, philosophy in general) in the 18th and 19th centuries. It was influential in the thinking of Leo Tolstoy, amongst others, in the elevated form that history could not be accepted as random.

A sufficient reason is sometimes described as the coincidence of every single thing that is needed for the occurrence of an effect (i.e. of the so-called necessary conditions). Such view could perhaps be also applied to indeterministic systems, as long as randomness is in a way incorporated in the preconditions.

Hamilton's fourth law: "Infer nothing without ground or reason"
Here is how Hamilton, circa 1837–1838, expressed his "fourth law" in his LECT. V. LOGIC. 60–61:

"I now go on to the fourth law.

"Par. XVII. Law of Sufficient Reason, or of Reason and Consequent:

"XVII. The thinking of an object, as actually characterized by positive or by negative attributes, is not left to the caprice of Understanding – the faculty of thought; but that faculty must be necessitated to this or that determinate act of thinking by a knowledge of something different from, and independent of; the process of thinking itself. This condition of our understanding is expressed by the law, as it is called, of Sufficient Reason (principium Rationis Sufficientis); but it is more properly denominated the law of Reason and Consequent (principium Rationis et Consecutionis). That knowledge by which the mind is necessitated to affirm or posit something else, is called the logical reason ground, or antecedent; that something else which the mind is necessitated to affirm or posit, is called the logical consequent; and the relation between the reason and consequent, is called the logical connection or consequence. This law is expressed in the formula – Infer nothing without a ground or reason.1

"Relations between Reason and Consequent: The relations between Reason and Consequent, when comprehended in a pure thought, are the following:
1. When a reason is explicitly or implicitly given, then there must exist a consequent; and, vice versa, when a consequent is given, there must also exist a reason.

1 See Schulze, Logik, §19, and Krug, Logik, §20, – ED.

"2. Where there is no reason there can be no consequent; and, vice versa, where there is no consequent (either implicitly or explicitly) there can be no reason. That is, the concepts of reason and of consequent, as reciprocally relative, involve and suppose each other.

"The logical significance of this law: The logical significance of the law of Reason and Consequent lies in this, – That in virtue of it, thought is constituted into a series of acts all indissolubly connected; each necessarily inferring the other. Thus it is that the distinction and opposition of possible, actual and necessary matter, which has been introduced into Logic, is a doctrine wholly extraneous to this science."

Schopenhauer's Four Forms

According to Schopenhauer's On the Fourfold Root of the Principle of Sufficient Reason, there are four distinct forms of the principle.

First Form: The Principle of Sufficient Reason of Becoming (principium rationis sufficientis fiendi); appears as the law of causality in the understanding.

Second Form: The Principle of Sufficient Reason of Knowing (principium rationis sufficientis cognoscendi); asserts that if a judgment is to express a piece of knowledge, it must have a sufficient ground or reason, in which case it receives the predicate true.

Third Form: The Principle of Sufficient Reason of Being (principium rationis sufficientis essendi); the law whereby the parts of space and time determine one another as regards those relations.  Example in arithmetic: Each number presupposes the preceding numbers as grounds or reasons of its being; "I can reach ten only by going through all the preceding numbers; and only by virtue of this insight into the ground of being, do I know that where there are ten, so are there eight, six, four."

"Now just as the subjective correlative to the first class of representations is the understanding, that to the second the faculty of reason, and that to the third pure sensibility, so is the subjective correlative to this fourth class found to be the inner sense, or generally self-consciousness." 

Fourth Form: The Principle of Sufficient Reason of Acting (principium rationis sufficientis agendi); briefly known as the law of motivation.  "Any judgment that does not follow its previously existing ground or reason" or any state that cannot be explained away as falling under the three previous headings "must be produced by an act of will which has a motive." As his proposition in 43 states, "Motivation is causality seen from within."

Proposed proofs of universal validity

Several proofs have been prepared in order to demonstrate that the universe is at bottom causal, i.e. works in accord with the principle in question; perhaps not in a single case (chance may play a role, say, in the editing of this article), but that causality must be the way it works at least in general, in most of what we see; and that our minds are aware of the principle even before any experience. A famous argument or proof as proposed by Immanuel Kant from the form of Time, temporal ordering of events and "directionality" of time may be cited here to flesh out the intro paragraph.

A proof of the a priori nature the concept of causality may be inferred if one looks at how all perception depends on causality and the intellect. However, Arthur Schopenhauer claims that "a proof for the principle of sufficient reason in particular is especially absurd and is evidence of a want of reflection," and that he who seeks a proof  "finds himself involved in that circle of demanding a proof for the right to demand a proof."

Given that causal interconnections (i.e. an "arrow of time"), as a form of the Principle of Sufficient Reason, indeed must in general exist everywhere in the universe (at least in the large scale), backwards causality in general might then be precluded using a form of the paradox of free will (i.e. an event that has a future source might cause us to remove that source quick enough and thus causality would not work).

See also
 Causality
 Deterministic system (philosophy)
 Law of thought
 Identity of indiscernibles 
 Nothing comes from nothing
 Principle of insufficient reason
 Dependent origination
 Münchhausen trilemma 
 Brute fact
 Necessity and sufficiency

References

External links

Sir William Hamilton, 9th Baronet, (Henry L. Mansel and John Veitch, ed.), 1860 Lectures on Metaphysics and Logic, in Two Volumes. Vol. II. Logic, Boston: Gould and Lincoln. 
Alexander R. Pruss, The Principle of Sufficient Reason: A Reassessment

Abstraction
Concepts in epistemology
Concepts in logic
Concepts in metaphilosophy
Concepts in metaphysics
Concepts in the philosophy of mind
Concepts in the philosophy of science
Epistemological theories
Gottfried Wilhelm Leibniz
History of logic
Metaphysical theories
Metaphysics of mind
Ontology
Philosophical logic
Philosophical problems
Principles
Rationalism
Reasoning
Truth